Hans von Tschammer und Osten (25 October 1887 – 25 March 1943) was a German sport official, SA leader and a member of the Reichstag for the Nazi Party of Nazi Germany. He was married to Sophie Margarethe von Carlowitz.

Hans von Tschammer und Osten led the German Sports Office Deutscher Reichsausschuss für Leibesübungen (DRA) "German Reich Commission for Physical Exercise" after the Nazi seizure of power in 1933. In July the same year Hans von Tschammer took the title of Reichssportführer, "Reich Sports Leader", and the whole sports sphere in Germany was placed under his control. He re-established the organization he led, transforming it into the Sports governing body of the Third Reich, Deutscher Reichsbund für Leibesübungen (DRL) "Sports League of the German Reich". In 1937 it was renamed Nationalsozialistischer Reichsbund für Leibesübungen "National-Socialist Sports League of the German Reich". Von Tschammer held the high-profile post of Reichssportführer until his death in 1943.

The name of today's DFB-Pokal, Deutscher Fußball-Bund-Pokal "German Football-Federation Cup", first contested in the 1934-35 season during von Tschammer's tenure as Reichssportführer, was known as Hans von Tschammer und Osten-Pokal ("Tschammerpokal") until it was last played in Nazi Germany in 1943. Many other innovative improvements regarding the organization of sports events that von Tschammer's formidable Reich Sports Organ introduced, like the Olympic torch relay, are still in use today.

Biography

Hans von Tschammer und Osten was born in a family of landed gentry. After receiving a traditional upper-class education he went to fight to the front in the First World War. During the times of the Weimar Republic he joined the SA, becoming a Gruppenführer, "Group Leader", rising up to become a colonel of the paramilitary organization and later a member of the Reichstag.
Von Tschammer was named Reichskommissar für Turnen und Sport (Commissioner for Gym and Sports of the Reich) of the German Sports Office Deutscher Reichsausschuss für Leibesübungen (DRA) on 19 July 1933. Although he had been a relatively unknown figure in German sports, Von Tschammer saw as his goal the use of sports "to improve the morale and productivity of German workers." Sporting skills were made a criterion for school graduation as well as a necessary qualification for certain jobs and admission to universities.

After Adolf Hitler's accession to power, von Tschammer disbanded the DRA, branded as a "bourgeois entity", on 5 May 1933 (officially 10 May) and re-established it as a Nazi-oriented organization, the Deutscher Reichsbund für Leibesübungen (DRL).

Von Tschammer was an active and able promoter of sports in Nazi Germany. He instituted the present-day German Football-Federation Cup. He also commissioned the publication of Sport und Staat (Sports and State), a massive four-volume Nazi propaganda report on the organized sports activities in the Third Reich. Sport und Staat was made by Arno Breitmeyer and Hitler's personal photographer Heinrich Hoffmann. This lavishly illustrated work had many pictures and information about the various Nazi organizations, i.e. SA, NSKK, Bund Deutscher Mädel, Hitler Jugend, etc. Printed in 1934 by the publishing house of the German Sports Aid Funds, a branch of the DRL, only volume one and two of a planned series of four volumes were published.

The aims of the promotion of sports in the Third Reich included hardening the spirit of every German as well as making German citizens feel that they were part of a wider national purpose. This was in line with the ideals of Friedrich Ludwig Jahn, the "Father of physical exercises", who connected the steeling of one's own body to a healthy spirit and promoted the idea of a unified, strong Germany.  A more controversial aim was the demonstration of Aryan physical superiority.
Hans von Tschammer und Osten enjoyed the Nazi sports festivals in which he took a keen interest as organizer. He appears often as spectator in white suit during the massive displays of Nazi pageantry.

The Summer Olympics in Berlin were held during von Tschammer's tenure as Reichssportführer. He played a major role in the structure and organization of the Olympic Games together with Carl Diem, who was the former secretary of the Deutscher Reichsausschuss für Leibesübungen (DRA). Von Tschammer trusted the organization of the Fourth Winter Olympics in Garmisch-Partenkirchen to Karl Ritter von Halt, whom he named President of the Committee for the organization of the games. Von Tschammer would be later blamed by historians for enforcing a ban on non-Aryans in Germany's Olympic team, a fact that was condemned internationally as a violation of the Olympic ethical code. But it is doubtful that he was the only one of the NSRL leaders behind that decision.

Despite his major role in the Olympics and in the world of sports of his time, von Tschammer never became a member of the International Olympic Committee (IOC), a post he craved. In 1937 Karl Ritter von Halt was elected as member of the Executive Committee of the IOC instead of him. Von Tschammer's influence within the Nazi Party also began rapidly eroding towards the end of the 1930s decade despite being a topmost Nazi leader. The war preparations would make the influence of sports in Nazi Germany wane in favour of militarism.

Hans von Tschammer und Osten, however, would never see the end of the organization he had led for so long. He also would never see Germany losing World War II, for he died from pneumonia in Berlin in 1943. The assets he left behind were negligible for a man of his position. Von Tschammer was succeeded as Reichssportführer by Arno Breitmeyer.

See also
DFB-Pokal
Nationalsozialistischer Reichsbund für Leibesübungen
1936 Summer Olympics
Deutsches Turn- und Sportfest 1938

Notes and references

Attribution
(partly)

External links

1936 German Olympic symbols and pictures
 

1887 births
1943 deaths
Politicians from Dresden
Deaths from pneumonia in Germany
German Army personnel of World War I
German untitled nobility
Nazi Party officials
People from the Kingdom of Saxony
Sturmabteilung officers
German referees and umpires
Nobility from Dresden
Members of the Reichstag of the Weimar Republic
Members of the Reichstag of Nazi Germany